The Web of the Chozen is a novel by Jack L. Chalker published in 1978.

Plot summary
The Web of the Chozen is a novel about Bar Holliday as he is physically transformed into a quadruped by a mutant virus on a lost colony.

Reception
Howard Thompson reviewed The Web of the Chozen in The Space Gamer No. 15. Thompson commented that "The redeeming feature of The Web of the Chozen is that some of the ideas are interesting and, in selected spots, are handled with moderate style. It would be far more interesting if the characters could be seen side ways, and did more than walk through their lines."

Reviews
Review by Andrew Kaveney (1979) in Foundation, #15 January 1979
Kliatt

References

1978 novels
Novels by Jack L. Chalker